Yekaterina Ivanovna Yezhova (1787-1837), was a Russian Empire stage actress. She was a leading celebrated star at the Imperial Theatre of Saint Petersburg in 1805-1837 and also a salon hostess, known for her relationship with Prince Alexander Shakhovskoy.

Notes

1787 births
1837 deaths
Salon holders from the Russian Empire
Actresses from the Russian Empire